Boglárka Megyeri (born 19 July 1987 in Budapest) is a Hungarian football midfielder currently playing in the Hungarian First Division for Viktória FC-Szombathely. She is a member of the Hungarian national team.

References

1987 births
Living people
Hungarian women's footballers
Hungary women's international footballers
Viktória FC-Szombathely players
Women's association football midfielders
Footballers from Budapest